Pleuroseta is a genus of flies belonging to the family Lesser Dung flies.

Species
P. wentworthi (Richards, 1973)

References

Sphaeroceridae
Diptera of Australasia
Brachycera genera